WWSA-LP is an Oldies formatted broadcast radio station licensed to St. Albans, West Virginia, serving St. Albans, Cross Lanes, Nitro, and Tornado in West Virginia.  WWSA-LP is owned and operated by City of St. Albans.

Programming and Studios
Along with the station's Oldies format, WWSA-LP also broadcasts features regarding the history of St. Albans.  Interviews with "individuals who have historical backgrounds related to the city" are also heard on the station.

The Museum of Radio and Technology, located in nearby Huntington, West Virginia, donated equipment to the station and built a "vintage studio" in the St. Albans City Hall.  The station initially operated from a "broom closet" at the City Municipal Building. In 2017, the studio was moved to the St. Albans Chamber of Commerce at 412 6th Avenue.

References

External links
 96.9 WWSA Online
 

2016 establishments in West Virginia
Oldies radio stations in the United States
Radio stations established in 2016
WSA-LP
WSA-LP